Pablo Moreno de Alborán Ferrándiz (born 31 May 1989), popularly known as Pablo Alborán, is a Spanish musician and singer-songwriter. Throughout his career, Alborán has released five studio albums, two live albums, and various musical collaborations. His records are distributed by Warner Music Spain which he was signed to in 2013. That year he released "Solamente Tú", the lead single from his 2011 self-titled debut album. The track topped the charts in his home country for two consecutive weeks. The album peaked at number one in its first week of sales, making Alborán the first solo artist to sign a complete debut album to rank to the top since 1998 in Spain. Alborán was nominated for Best New Artist at the 12th Latin Grammy Awards.

Alborán's sophomore record Tanto (2012) spawned the number one singles "Quién" and "El Beso". It received a Latin Grammy Award for Album of the Year. His third studio album Terral (2014) spawned the chart-topping singles "Por Fin" and "Pasos de Cero" and received a Grammy Award nomination for Best Latin Pop Album. Alborán embarked on a huge concert tour Tour Terral, which visited Europe, North, and South America. Its respective live album Tres Noches en Las Ventas marked Alborán's second Album of the Year nomination. In 2017, Alborán released his fourth studio album Prometo to critical and commercial success. It spawned the singles "Saturno" and "No Vaya a Ser", among others. Three years later, he released his fifth record Vértigo.

Throughout his career, Alborán has won a Goya Award for Best Original Song, nine LOS40 Music Awards, two Gaviota de Oro and two Premios Dial, among others. Throughout the years, Alborán has been nominated for three Grammy Awards as well as twenty-three Latin Grammy Awards.

Music career
From a very young age, he was interested in learning to play various musical instruments such as piano, classical guitar, flamenco guitar, and acoustic guitar, and attended singing lessons with professional artists in Málaga and Madrid. In 2002, at the age of 12, he composed his first songs, "Amor de Barrio" (Neighbourhood Love) and "Desencuentro" (Disagreement) which would be featured 10 years later on his debut album. In Málaga he performed for the first time with a Flamenco band in a restaurant, and he was nicknamed El Blanco Moreno (The White Moreno), because he "was very pale-skinned and Moreno was my family name", as he stated in an interview in early 2011. Later, Pablo met producer Manuel Illán and recorded a demo, which included a cover of "Deja de Volverme Loca" (Stop Driving Me Crazy) by Diana Navarro. Upon hearing this recording, Navarro expressed great interest in Alborán and became his musical mentor.

In preparation for his first album, Alborán composed a total of 40 songs from which the playlist would be selected. During the recording of this studio album, Pablo Alborán, he uploaded a few songs on YouTube, which gained the attention of many, including singer Kelly Rowland who was amazed by his voice, as far as saying "I'm in love with Pablo Alboran!". His videos have since received millions of views.

"Solamente Tú" (Only You) was digitally released in Spain in October 2010 as the first single of his debut album, which was released in February 2011. Both the single and the album were a huge success, managing to top the Spanish music charts for several consecutive weeks. The album won multiple awards, including RTVE's Album of the Year for 2011, and became Spain's best-selling album of that year.

Alborán began his first world tour on 27 May 2011 in Madrid at the Palacio Vistalegre, and has since performed in many Latin American countries, among which are Argentina, Chile and Mexico. Following his success, he released his first live album, En Acústico, in November of the same year. It included acoustic versions of most of the tracks in his debut album, as well as two new songs and four bonus tracks. The song "Perdóname" (Forgive Me) was re-recorded featuring Portuguese singer Carminho, and was released as the first single of the album, peaking at number one on the Spanish singles chart on 13 November 2011, thus helping En Acústico to debut also at number one on the albums chart one week later, on 20 November 2011, and to top the Portuguese Albums Chart in January 2012.

On 19 December 2011, Alborán received the 2011 Best New Act award in Los Premios 40 Principales. Both his albums Pablo Alborán and En Acústico were featured in Spain's official list of top-selling albums of 2011, at number 1 and number 6, respectively, and singles "Solamente Tú" and "Perdóname" were the respective third and nineteenth best-selling songs in Spain in 2011.

In January 2012, Alborán collaborated on the charity single, "Cuestión de Prioridades por el Cuerno de África" (A matter of priorities for the horn of Africa).

In September 2012, Alborán released the lead single "Tanto" from his forthcoming album Tanto which was released in November 2012. The album was certified 10× Platinum in Spain and was the highest selling album in Spain in 2012 and 2013. The album included two number one singles in Spain, "El Beso" (The Kiss) and "Quién" (Who). The album received Latin Grammy Awards.

Alborán released his third studio album Terral in November 2014. The album became his fourth straight number 1 album in Spain and has been certified 8× Platinum. It was the highest selling album in Spain in 2014.

In April 2016, "Se Puede Amar" was released, which is the first single of the forthcoming fourth studio album. Throughout 2016, Alborán toured Central America. In August, Alboran re-released ""Dónde está el Amor" with Brazilian singer Tiê. It was included in the telenovela soundtrack Haja Coração.

On 8 September 2017, after a two-year break, Alborán announced on his social networks that he was finishing preparing what would be his fourth studio album, Prometo. He released two singles ("Saturno" and "No Vaya a Ser") on the same day. "Saturno" is a ballad, reminiscent of his beginnings as a singer, while "No Vaya a Ser" is a different style flirting with electronics and African rhythms. Prometo was released on 17 November 2017 and debuted at number 1 in Spain.

Personal life
Alborán is the son of Spanish architect Salvador Moreno de Alborán Peralta and Elena Ferrándiz Martínez. From a father from Malaga and a French mother, the daughter of Spaniards born in Casablanca during the French protectorate of Morocco.

In June 2020, Alborán came out as gay. As of December 2020, Alborán resides in Málaga.

Discography

Studio albums

Live albums

Singles

As main artist

As featured artist

Other charting songs

Awards

Grammy Awards
The Grammy Awards are awarded annually by the National Academy of Recording Arts and Sciences in the United States. Alborán has received three nominations.

!scope="col"|
|-
!scope="row" rowspan="1"| 2016
| Terral
|rowspan="3"| Best Latin Pop Album
| 
| style="text-align:center;" rowspan="1"|
|-
!scope="row" rowspan="1"| 2019
| Prometo
| 
| style="text-align:center;" rowspan="1"|
|-
!scope="row" rowspan="1"| 2022
| Vértigo
| 
| style="text-align:center;" rowspan="1"|
|-

Latin Grammy Awards
The Latin Grammy Awards are awarded annually by the Latin Academy of Recording Arts & Sciences in the United States. Alborán has received twenty-four nominations.

!scope="col"|
|-
!scope="row" rowspan="3"| 2011
| Pablo Alborán
| Best New Artist
| 
| style="text-align:center;" rowspan="3"|
|-
| "Solamente Tú"
| Song of the Year
|
|-
| Pablo Alborán
| Best Male Pop Vocal Album
|
|-
!scope="row" rowspan="1"| 2012
| En Acústico
| Best Contemporary Pop Vocal Album
| 
| style="text-align:center;" rowspan="1"|
|-
!scope="row" rowspan="3"| 2013
| "Tanto"
| Record of the Year
| 
| style="text-align:center;" rowspan="3"|
|-
|scope="row" rowspan="2"| Tanto
| Album of the Year
| 
|-
| Best Traditional Pop Vocal Album
| 
|-
!scope="row" rowspan="1"| 2014
| "Dónde está el Amor"
| Record of the Year
| 
| style="text-align:center;" rowspan="1"|
|-
!scope="row" rowspan="3"| 2015
|scope="row" rowspan="2"| Terral
| Best Contemporary Pop Vocal Album
| 
| style="text-align:center;" rowspan="3"|
|-
| Best Long Form Music Video
| 
|-
| "Por Fin"
| Song of the Year
| 
|-
!scope="row" rowspan="3"| 2016
|scope="row" rowspan="2"| Tour Terral
| Album of the Year
| 
| style="text-align:center;" rowspan="3"|
|-
| Best Contemporary Pop Vocal Album
| 
|-
| "Se Puede Amar"
| Record of the Year
| 
|-
!scope="row" rowspan="3"| 2018
|scope="row" rowspan="2"| Prometo
| Album of the Year
| 
| style="text-align:center;" rowspan="3"|
|-
| Best Traditional Pop Vocal Album
| 
|-
| "No Vaya a Ser"
| Record of the Year
| 
|-
!scope="row" rowspan="2"| 2020
|scope="row" rowspan="2"| "Cuando Estés Aquí"
| Record of the Year
| 
| style="text-align:center;" rowspan="2"|
|-
| Best Pop Song
| 
|-
!scope="row" rowspan="4"| 2021
| rowspan="2"| "Si Hubieras Querido"
| Record of the Year
| 
| style="text-align:center;" rowspan="4"|
|-
| Song of the Year
| 
|-
| rowspan="2"| Vértigo
| Album of the Year
| 
|-
| Best Traditional Pop Vocal Album
| 
|-
!scope="row" rowspan="1"| 2022
| "Castillos de Arena"
| Record of the Year
| 
|
|-

TVyNovelas Awards
The TVyNovelas Awards are presented annually by Televisa and the magazine TVyNovelas to honor the best Mexican television productions, including telenovelas.

!scope="col"|
|-
|2017
| "Se Puede Amar"
|rowspan="2"| Best Musical Theme
| 
|
|-
|2018
| "Saturno"
| 
|
|-

Goya Awards
The Goya Awards, known in Spanish as los Premios Goya, are awarded annually by the Academia de las Artes y las Ciencias Cinematográficas de España (Spanish Academy of Cinematic Art and Science) in Spain. Alborán has received one award.

!scope="col"|
|-
!scope="row" rowspan="1"| 2016
| Palmeras en la nieve (with Lucas Vidal)
| Best Original Song
| 
| style="text-align:center;" rowspan="7"|
|-

Notes

References

External links
  

 
Living people
1989 births
Singers from Andalusia
People from Málaga
21st-century Spanish male singers
Spanish pop singers
Spanish male singer-songwriters
Latin music songwriters
Gay singers
Gay songwriters
Spanish gay musicians
Spanish LGBT singers
Spanish LGBT songwriters
21st-century Spanish LGBT people
20th-century Spanish LGBT people
LGBT people in Latin music